DeGrazia Gallery in the Sun Historic District is the artistic manifestation and architecture constructed by Ettore DeGrazia. The property is a series of buildings scattered throughout a natural desert setting. Built in Tucson near the intersection of Swan Road and Skyline the property is now a museum open to the public. Construction began in 1951 with the open air Mission in the Sun followed by a series of other expressionistic adobe buildings. The gallery/museum was constructed in 1965 with details including cactus flooring, exposed wood beams, rafters and unique artistic finishes.

The gallery replaced the first DeGrazia Building constructed in 1944 on the corner of Prince and Campbell Road.  Artists and friends who spent time at the new gallery included Thomas Hart Benton, Olaf Wieghorst, Jack Van Ryder, Pete Martinez and Ross Santee. In 2006, the  property, now a museum of DeGrazia's work, was listed on the National Register of Historic Places.

The first building on the site, The Mission in the Sun was dedicated to Our Lady of Guadalupe and to the memory of Padre Eusebio Kino.  DeGrazia hand painted every wall with murals and included a large painting of Our Lady of Guadalupe at the brick altar.  Visitors have used the Mission as their own spiritual site often leaving photos, candles and other mementos.  The Mission has also hosted many weddings throughout the years.  On May 30, 2017 a fire heavily damaged the Mission. At the time of the fire there were no hanging pictures by DeGrazia inside the chapel, but walls, murals and the roof were damaged. Conservators began work to salvage and restore some of the artifacts. The walls were plastered over to secure what remained of the original murals, 80% of which were destroyed. One of the conservators is an artist personally mentored by DeGrazia. The restored chapel reopened to the public in the fall of 2019. Some of the fire damage was intentionally retained.

Buildings

 Mission in the Sun  1952
 DeGrazia House   1952
 Island House  1954 (demolished)
 Ceramics Studio   1954
 Brian's House   1955
 Ghost House   1956
 Gate House    1960
 Gallery in the Sun  1965
 Garage            1966
 Nun's house   1968
 Underground House  1969
 Apartment    1972
 DeGrazia Grave   1982

Images

Bibliography
 Adams, Margaret, Artist DeGrazia Built His Own Empire, Arizona Wildcat, December 17, 1962.
 Clinco, Demion, DeGrazia Gallery in the Sun National Register of Historic Places Nomination, 2006.
 Buildings of Architectural Significance in Tucson, The American Institute of Architects, building number three. October 1960.
 Hermit Artist Builds Own Mission, National Geographic Magazine, September 1953, pp350.
 Cardon, Charlotte, “DeGrazia Creates His Own Environment.” The Arizona Daily Star, October 1964.

References

External links 

 DeGrazia Foundation website

Art museums and galleries in Arizona
Museums in Tucson, Arizona
Historic district contributing properties in Arizona
National Register of Historic Places in Tucson, Arizona
Buildings and structures in Tucson, Arizona
Buildings and structures on the National Register of Historic Places in Arizona
Pueblo Revival architecture in Arizona